Marapurani Manishi is a 1973 Indian Telugu-language drama film directed by T. Rama Rao. The film stars Akkineni Nageswara Rao and Manjula, with music composed by K. V. Mahadevan. It is a remake of the Malayalam film Odayil Ninnu (1965), which was adapted from the novel of the same name. Nageswara Rao won the Filmfare Award for Best Actor – Telugu for this film.

Plot 
Abbi is an orphan and self-esteemed person, who stands on his own and works as a rickshaw puller. He lives in a colony where everyone credits him for his amiable nature and hotel owner Rangaiah (S. V. Ranga Rao) treats him as his son, but he never seeks his help. Abbi falls in love with a beautiful girl Lakshmi (Manjula) and both spend time happily. One night, he helps a family of wealthy man Shankar (Jaggayya) from heavy rainfall, in return, he invites him provides good hospitality, including his wife Parvathi (Jayanthi) and their cute little daughter Ammulu (Baby Sridevi), showers love on him. From there on, Abbi becomes their debtor, and Ammulu goes to school in his rickshaw when he knows his life ambition of Shankar is to see Ammulu as a graduate. Meanwhile, the wheel of fortune blights Abbi's life when Lakshmi is molested and killed by a goon Ranga (Ananda Mohan), In anger, Abbi slays him and thereby lands in jail.

After release, Rangaiah accommodates him with a rickshaw when he gets shocked to spot Ammulu as a beggar and Parvathi as a widow. Here he learns that Shankar is bankrupted and died. Now Abbi dedicates his life to their welfare and his only aim is to make Ammulu a graduate. Time passes, and Abbi strives hard at the cost of his health, but Ammulu develops aversion and hatred towards him as she is habituated to a rich lifestyle, yet, Abbi does not leave his aim. Years roll by, Abbi almost becomes terminally ill, and Ammulu (Latha) falls in love with a rich guy Shekar (Chandra Mohan), to which Abbi opposes when Ammulu insults him very badly. Then, Parvati berates Ammulu and makes her understand the virtue of Abbi when she realizes her folly and adheres to his word. Thereafter, Abbi toils and succeeds to see Ammulu's graduation gown. Meanwhile, Shekar convinces his father Ananda Rao (Gummadi), and everyone accepts their marriage. Finally, the movie ends with Abbi blessing the newly wedded couple and breathing his last, happily.

Cast 

Akkineni Nageswara Rao as Abbi
Manjula as Lakshmi
S. V. Ranga Rao as Rangaiah
Gummadi as Ananda Rao
Jaggayya as Shankar
Raja Babu as Delhi
Nagabhushanam as Varaalu
Chandra Mohan as Shekar
Mada
P. J. Sarma
Kakarala
Ch. Krishna Murthy
Ananda Mohan as Ranga
Chitti Babu as P. Pal
Jayanthi as Parvathi
Latha as Ammulu
Roja Ramani as Middle age Ammulu
Pushpa Kumari as Varaalu's wife
Baby Sridevi as Young Ammulu

Soundtrack 
Music composed by K. V. Mahadevan.

References

External links 
 

1973 drama films
Films directed by T. Rama Rao
Films scored by K. V. Mahadevan
Indian drama films
Telugu remakes of Malayalam films